Mondorff (Lorraine Franconian: Munnerëf) is a commune in the Moselle department in Grand Est in north-eastern France.

Proximity of border with Luxembourg

It lies on the border with Luxembourg. The town in neighbouring Luxembourg to which it lies adjacent is Mondorf-les-Bains.

A former border control station is now disused.

Spelling

The name of the French commune is notably spelt with a double 'ff' (in contrast with the single 'f' in the French name of the adjacent Luxembourg commune: Mondorf-les-Bains).

See also
 Communes of the Moselle department

References

External links
 

Communes of Moselle (department)
France–Luxembourg border crossings